High and Low is a 1933 French drama film directed by G. W. Pabst.

Cast
In alphabetical order
 Ariane Borg as (as Olga Muriel)
 Pauline Carton as Seamstress
 Janine Crispin as Marie de Ferstel (as Jeannine Crispin)
 Christiane Delyne
 Jean Gabin as Charles Boulla
 Catherine Hessling as Girl in Love
 Margo Lion as Mme Binder as la propriétaire
 Peter Lorre as Beggar
 Milly Mathis as Poldi
 Mauricet as M. Binder
 Michel Simon as M. Bodeletz
 Vladimir Sokoloff as M. Berger

References

External links

1933 films
1933 drama films
1930s French-language films
French drama films
French black-and-white films
Films directed by G. W. Pabst
1930s French films